Hungry for Love may refer to:

"Hungry for Love" (Johnny Kidd & The Pirates song), 1963
"Hungry For Love", a 1988 single from Bad Boys Blue
"Hungry For Love", a song by Billy Ocean from his self-titled album
"Hungry for Love", a song by The Weather Girls from Success
Hungry For Love, an alternate title for the 1960 Italian film Adua and Friends

See also
"Hungry for Your Love", a 1986 single by Hanson & Davis
Hunger for Love (Portuguese: Fome de Amor), a 1968 Brazilian film